Van-e Sofla (also Romanized as Vān-e Soflá; also known as Vān-e Pā’īn) is a village in Ojarud-e Sharqi Rural District, Muran District, Germi County, Ardabil Province, Iran. At the 2006 census, its population was 352, in 70 families.

References 

Towns and villages in Germi County